Formica comata is a species of ant in the family Formicidae.

References

Further reading

 

comata
Articles created by Qbugbot
Insects described in 1909